Thomas Kent (1590–1656), of Winsley and Devizes, Wiltshire, was an English politician.

He was a Member (MP) of the Parliament of England for Devizes in 1628.

References

1590 births
1656 deaths
People from Devizes
English MPs 1628–1629